The 8 cm Luftminenwerfer M 15 (Pneumatic trench mortar) was a light mortar used by Austria-Hungary in World War I. It was designed by the 58th Infantry Division and the first twenty were built in the division's workshops. Later production was contracted out to Vereinigte Elektrische Maschinen A. G. in Budapest. It used the breakable screw method to retain the bomb in place until the air pressure in the chamber was strong enough to break the screw. Grooves of different depths could be used to vary the range. It was sometimes referred to as the Roka-Halasz system.

References
 Ortner, M. Christian. The Austro-Hungarian Artillery From 1867 to 1918: Technology, Organization, and Tactics. Vienna, Verlag Militaria, 2007

External links 
 http://www.moesslang.net/minenwerfer8cm.htm

Mortars of Austria-Hungary
Pneumatic mortars
Infantry mortars
80 mm artillery